Porter's rock rat (Aconaemys porteri) is a species of rodent in the family Octodontidae. It is found in Argentina and Chile at altitudes between 900 and 2,000 meters above sea level.

References

Aconaemys
Mammals described in 1917
Taxa named by Oldfield Thomas